Autoba silicula is a species of moth in the family Noctuidae. As a pest of millets, it forms a web in millet earheads and feeds on grains.

References

Boletobiinae
Insect pests of millets
Moths described in 1897